is a former Japanese football player.

Club career
Yoshihiro was born in Kudamatsu on May 4, 1985. After graduating from high school, he joined Sanfrecce Hiroshima in 2004. He played in the matches as defender from first season. However he could hardly play in the match in 2007 and he moved to Consadole Sapporo in 2008. He played as regular player in 2009. However his opportunity to play decreased in 2010 and he left the club end of 2010 season. From 2011, he played for many clubs in J2 League and Japan Football League; Ehime FC (2011), Tokyo Verdy (2012), FC Machida Zelvia (2013), Renofa Yamaguchi FC (2014), MIO Biwako Shiga (2015) and Maruyasu Okazaki (2016-2017). He retired end of 2017 season.

National team career
In June 2005, Yoshihiro was selected Japan U-20 national team for 2005 World Youth Championship. But he did not play in the match

Club statistics

References

External links

1985 births
Living people
Association football people from Yamaguchi Prefecture
Japanese footballers
J1 League players
J2 League players
Japan Football League players
Sanfrecce Hiroshima players
Hokkaido Consadole Sapporo players
Ehime FC players
Tokyo Verdy players
FC Machida Zelvia players
Renofa Yamaguchi FC players
MIO Biwako Shiga players
FC Maruyasu Okazaki players
Association football defenders